Juliana; Or, The Princess Of Poland is a 1671 tragedy by the English writer John Crowne. It was originally staged by the Duke's Company at the Lincoln's Inn Fields Theatre in London.

The original cast included Mary Betterton as  Juliana, Thomas Betterton as Ladislaus, Henry Harris as Cardinal, John Young as Demetrius, William Smith as  Sharnofsky, Samuel Sandford as Cassonofsky, Henry Norris as Colimsky, Edward Angel as Landlord, Matthew Medbourne as Theodore, John Crosby as  Alexey, Jane Long as Paulina and Anne Shadwell as Joanna.

References

Bibliography
 Van Lennep, W. The London Stage, 1660-1800: Volume One, 1660-1700. Southern Illinois University Press, 1960.

1671 plays
West End plays
Tragedy plays
Plays by John Crowne